The 2018 State of Origin series was the 37th annual best-of-three series between the Queensland and New South Wales rugby league teams. Before this series, Queensland had won 21 times, NSW 13 times, with two series drawn. The 2018 series was won by New South Wales, after winning the first 2 games of the series, their first since 2014, and their second since 2005.

Kevin Walters coached Queensland for the third year in a row, while New South Wales were coached by Brad Fittler after he replaced Laurie Daley in November 2017.

Game I 

 Billy Slater was originally selected at fullback for Queensland but had to withdraw due to an injury. He was replaced at fullback by Michael Morgan, with Anthony Milford coming on to the bench as a replacement.

Game II

Game III

Player Debuts

Game 1 

  Cap no. 268, Josh Addo-Carr
  Cap no. 269, Reagan Campbell-Gillard
  Cap no. 270, Nathan Cleary
  Cap no. 271, Damien Cook
  Cap no. 272, Jack de Belin
  Cap no. 273, Latrell Mitchell
  Cap no. 274, James Roberts
  Cap no. 275, Tom Trbojevic
  Cap no. 276, Angus Crichton
  Cap no. 277, Tyrone Peachey
  Cap no. 278, Paul Vaughan

  Cap no. 194, Andrew McCullough
  Cap no. 195, Felise Kaufusi
  Cap no. 196, Jai Arrow

Game 2 

  Cap no. 279, Matt Prior

  Cap no. 197, Kalyn Ponga

Game 3 

  Cap no. 280, Tariq Sims

Under 18s

Under 20s

Residents 

 Scott Sorensen was originally selected at second row and captain for New South Wales but withdrew. He was replaced at second row by Dean Britt, with Bayley Sironen coming on to the bench as a replacement, and was replaced as captain by Kyle Flanagan.

Women's State of Origin

References

2018 in Australian rugby league
State of Origin series